The 2003–04 Cypriot First Division was the 65th season of the Cypriot top-level football league. APOEL won their 18th title.

Format
Fourteen teams participated in the 2003–04 Cypriot First Division. All teams played against each other twice, once at their home and once away. The team with the most points at the end of the season crowned champions. The last three teams were relegated to the 2004–05 Cypriot Second Division.

The champions ensured their participation in the 2004–05 UEFA Champions League and the runners-up in the 2004–05 UEFA Cup.

The teams had to declare their interest to participate in the 2004 UEFA Intertoto Cup before the end of the championship. At the end of the championship, the higher placed team among the interested ones participated in the Intertoto Cup (if they had not secured their participation in any other UEFA competition).

Point system
Teams received three points for a win, one point for a draw and zero points for a loss.

Changes from previous season
Nea Salamina, Aris Limassol and Alki Larnaca were relegated from previous season and played in the 2003–04 Cypriot Second Division. They were replaced by the first three teams of the 2002–03 Cypriot Second Division, Anagennisi Deryneia, Doxa Katokopias and Onisilos Sotira.

Stadia and locations

League standings

Results

The score of the game Anagennisi-Onisilos was 2-2. Onisilos Sotiras won the appeal they filed in this game due to the irregular participation of a player of Anagennisi Derynia and the match was awarded with a score of 2-0 in their favour.

Top scorers

Source: soccerboards.com

See also
 Cypriot First Division
 2003–04 Cypriot Cup
 List of top goalscorers in Cypriot First Division by season
 Cypriot football clubs in European competitions

References

Sources

1. DIVISION 2003/2004

Cypriot First Division seasons
Cyprus
2003–04 in Cypriot football